

Events

January events 
 January 23 – Construction begins on the Northwestern Elevated Railroad of the Chicago "L" with the first structure erected at the intersection of Fullerton and Sheffield Avenues.

February events 
 February 14 – Northern Pacific Railway opens its Union Station in Portland, Oregon.
 February 24 – Erie Railroad purchases the New York, Pennsylvania & Ohio Railroad.

March events 
 March 20 – The Grand Trunk Railway purchases the Central Vermont Railway and begins operating it as a wholly owned subsidiary.

April events 
 April 6 – The Snowdon Mountain Railway in North Wales, the only Abt rack system line in the British Isles, commences public operation; however, a derailment leading to one fatality causes services to be suspended for a year.
 April 15 – Passenger rail service of the Henry Flagler Florida East Coast Railway arrives at its new terminus in Miami from West Palm Beach at the persuasion of Julia Tuttle; this quickly leads to incorporation of the city of Miami months later and extensive development of the Greater Miami, South Florida and the Keys.

May events
 May 2 – Budapest Metro Line 1 (Hungary), the world's second, is opened by Emperor Franz Joseph I of Austria.
 May 9 – First Nord Express, Paris, France/Oostend, Belgium, to Saint Petersburg, Russia.
 May 13 – The Pretoria–Pietersburg Railway, a predecessor of the Central South African Railways, is incorporated in London.
 May 30 – Construction of the Uganda Railway starts at Mombasa.

June events 
 June 29 – The St. Louis and San Francisco Railroad Company (predecessor of the St. Louis–San Francisco Railway) is incorporated.

July events 
 July 23 – Delivery of world's first commercially-built oil-engined locomotive, from Richard Hornsby & Sons of Grantham, England to the Royal Arsenal, Woolwich, London ( gauge).
 July 30 – Atlantic City rail crash: Shortly after 6:30 PM, at a crossing just west of Atlantic City, New Jersey, two trains collide, crushing five loaded passenger coaches, killing 50 and seriously injuring around 60.

September events 
 September 15 – The Missouri–Kansas–Texas Railroad (the 'Katy') conveys 40,000 people to Crush, Texas to witness a staged train wreck as a publicity stunt arranged by its general passenger agent, William George Crush. Three spectators are accidentally killed.

October events 
 October 5 – Norwegian Railway Museum established at Hamar.

December events 
 December 14 – Glasgow Subway, the third oldest metro system in the world, begins operations in Glasgow, Scotland.
 December 25 – Japanese National Railways opens two lines out of Tabata: an extension of the Tsuchiura Line from Tsuchiura, and the Sumidagawa Line to Sumidagawa.
 December 30 – , the first steel train ferry, makes its first voyage.

Unknown date events 
 The Green Bay & Western Railroad is formed from the bankruptcy proceedings of the Green Bay, Winona and Saint Paul Railroad.
 The Loup Creek & Deepwater Railway (predecessor of the Deepwater Railway) is formed.
 Atlas Car & Manufacturing Company of Cleveland, Ohio, begins building steam locomotives.
 Beyer, Peacock & Company of Manchester, England,  deliver the first five New South Wales T524 class 'Australian Consolidation' 2-8-0 type heavy goods locomotives to the New South Wales Government Railways, forerunners of the system's numerically largest class, finally totalling 280 representatives.
 Narrow gauge Ferrocarril de Tacubaya begins passenger service to Mexico City's Tacubaya amusement park.
 The first narrow gauge (750 mm) railway in Estonia connecting Valga with Pärnu is opened.

Deaths

January deaths 
 January 23 – Ferdinand Schichau, German mechanical engineer and founder of locomotive manufacturing company Schichau-Werke, dies (b. 1814).

June deaths
 June 4 – Austin Corbin, president of Long Island Rail Road (b. 1827).

October deaths
 October 21 – James Henry Greathead, English inventor of the tunnelling shield used for the London Underground (b. 1844).

References